The 1948–49 Wisconsin Badgers men's basketball team represented University of Wisconsin–Madison. The head coach was Harold E. Foster, coaching his fifteenth season with the Badgers. The team played their home games at the UW Fieldhouse in Madison, Wisconsin and was a member of the Big Nine Conference.

Schedule

|-
!colspan=12| Regular Season

References

Wisconsin Badgers men's basketball seasons
Wisconsin
1948 in sports in Wisconsin
1949 in sports in Wisconsin